Ali Pasha is a Turkish name given to several mosques. Notable mosque with the name include:

 Ali Pasha Mosque, Diyarbakır, Turkey
 Ali Pasha Mosque (Sarajevo) (1561), Bosnia and Herzegovina
 Ali Pasha Mosque (Tokat) (1572), Turkey

See also
Mosque of Muhammad Ali, Cairo, Egypt
Atik Ali Pasha Mosque, the name of two mosques in Fatih district, Istanbul, Turkey
 Kılıç Ali Pasha Mosque, Kılıç Ali Pasha Complex, Beyoğlu district, Istanbul, Turkey
Hekimoğlu Ali Pasha Mosque, Fatih district, Istanbul, Turkey